Steven Sserwadda (born 28 August 2002) is a Ugandan professional footballer who plays as a midfielder for Major League Soccer club New York Red Bulls and the Uganda national team.

Club career

KCCA
Born in Kampala, Sserwadda began his career in the youth setup of local club Kampala Capital City Authority FC in 2015. In 2018 he was promoted to the KCCA first team after rising through the ranks of the youth teams. A few months later he made his first international club appearance in the 2018–19 CAF Confederation Cup in a 2–1 victory against Tanzanian club, Mtibwa Sugar. During the 2018 Uganda Cup semi-finals, Sserwadda scored two goals in a 9–0 victory against Synergy FC. While with the club he won various titles, including: 1 Kagame Interclub Cup, 1 Uganda Premier League, 2 Super Cups, and a Super 8 Cup.

New York Red Bulls II
On 30 September 2021, Sserwadda joined USL Championship side  New York Red Bulls II. Sserwadda made his debut for Red Bulls II on  October 15, 2021, during a 1-1 draw against Tampa Bay Rowdies. On 31 July 2022, Sserwadda scored his first goal with New York Red Bulls II in a 1-2 loss to New Mexico United. On 9 August 2022, Sserwadda scored the equalizing goal in a 2-1 victory over Atlanta United 2.

New York Red Bulls (loan)
On 22 June 2022, the New York Red Bulls announced that they had signed Sserwadda to a short term loan ahead of their 2022 U.S. Open Cup quarterfinal against New York City FC. Sserwadda made his first team debut for the Red Bulls the same day as an 84th minute substitution for Luquinhas.

New York Red Bulls
On 9 July 2022, Sswerwadda made a permanent move to the Red Bulls first team roster.

International career
Sserwadda featured in all six matches for Uganda in the 2021 Africa U-20 Cup of Nations. He scored two goals in the group stage, playing a vital role in their run to the final. He debuted with the Uganda national team in a friendly 1–1 (5–4) penalty shootout win over Tajikistan on 25 March 2022.

Career statistics

Honours

Club
KCCA
Uganda Premier League (1): 2018–19
Uganda Cup (1): 2018

References

External links
 
 KCCA Stats (https://www.besoccer.com/player/s-sserwadda-728673)

Living people
2002 births
Sportspeople from Kampala
Ugandan footballers
Uganda international footballers
Association football midfielders
New York Red Bulls II players
New York Red Bulls players
USL Championship players
Ugandan expatriate footballers
Ugandan expatriates in the United States
Expatriate soccer players in the United States
Major League Soccer players
Uganda under-20 international footballers